Crocidura hikmiya (Sinharaja shrew or Sri Lankan rain forest shrew) is a species of shrew described from the rainforests of Sri Lanka, based on both morphological and molecular data. Its closest sister species is the Sri Lankan long-tailed shrew, another Sri Lankan crocidurine shrew restricted to the high-elevation habitats of the Central Highlands. C. hikmiya has a shorter tail than the Sri Lankan long-tailed shrew. Most of the other characteristics that distinguish the two species are osteological natured .

Etymology
The specific epithet hikmiya is Sinhala for ‘shrew’, applied here as a substantive in apposition. It is known as ශ්‍රී ලංකා සිංහරාජ කුනු හික් මීයා in Sinhala.

Habitat
It is known only from two forest-edge sites in Sinharaja Forest Reserve, at Kudawa and Morningside.

References

External links
 Wildlife Extra - A New Species of Shrew Described in Sri Lanka
https://www.gbif.org/species/119382294

hikmiya
Mammals of Sri Lanka
Mammals described in 2007